Colin Tannock (2 April 1891 – 1 November 1972) was a Scottish-born Australian politician.

He was born at Maryhill in Lanarkshire to gasfitter James Tannock and Euphemia Kennedy. Having migrated to New South Wales, he worked as an ironworker and was president of the Ironworkers' Union from 1924 to 1926, state secretary from 1926 to 19456, and president from 1955, as well as a delegate to the Australian Council of Trade Unions. From 1931 to 1952 he was a Labor member of the New South Wales Legislative Council. Tannock died in Sydney in 1972.

References

1891 births
1972 deaths
Australian Labor Party members of the Parliament of New South Wales
Members of the New South Wales Legislative Council
People from Lanarkshire
20th-century Australian politicians
Scottish emigrants to Australia
People from Maryhill